Campanula garganica, the Adriatic bellflower, syn. C. elatines var. garganica, is a species of flowering plant in the bellflower family Campanulaceae, native to Southern Europe. Basal rosettes of leaves bear a profusion of star-shaped blue flowers in summer.

Cultivars include 'Dickson's Gold', with gold-coloured foliage, and 'W.H. Paine', with white-centred, lilac coloured flowers. The latter has gained the Royal Horticultural Society's Award of Garden Merit, along with the species.

References

garganica